Mika Järvinen (born November 15, 1988) is a Finnish professional ice hockey goaltender. He currently plays for Vaasan Sport in Liiga.

He is the only goaltender who has scored a goal in the SM-liiga, done while playing for KalPa against Lukko on December 4, 2008.

References

External links

1988 births
Living people
Amur Khabarovsk players
Jokerit players
Finnish ice hockey goaltenders
People from Hämeenlinna
Sportspeople from Kanta-Häme